Madeley Old Hall is a black and white Elizabethan house, now a small hotel, in the village of Madeley in Staffordshire, England. It stands in 2 acres of landscaped gardens and is a Grade II* listed building.

Built in the late 1500s, it is a timber-framed building with plaster infill standing on a sandstone plinth, originally with a cruciform floor-plan. Across the front gable of the house is carved the warning  "WALLK KNAVE. WHAT LOOKEST AT".

The property was acquired in 2007 by Gary and Simon White and run as a country house hotel. It is also licensed for weddings.

See also
Grade II* listed buildings in Newcastle-under-Lyme (borough)
Listed buildings in Madeley, Staffordshire
Madeley Old Manor (Staffordshire)
Madeley Court (Shropshire)

References

   English Heritage: photograph and architectural description of listed building

Country houses in Staffordshire
Grade II* listed buildings in Staffordshire